Afterburner is the ninth studio album by the American rock band ZZ Top, released in 1985. Although critics' response to the album was lukewarm, Afterburner was a moderate success, going platinum and launching one hit single: "Sleeping Bag" which peaked at No. 1 on the Mainstream Rock Tracks and at No. 8 on the Billboard Hot 100.

In the UK, it was the band's second album to be certified by the British Phonographic Industry, attaining Gold (100,000 units) in 1985. In 1990, it was certified Platinum (300,000 units).

Recording
The album has songs with sequenced keyboard beds. It was the first ZZ Top record since Rio Grande Mud without involvement from Terry Manning.

Reception

Stephen Thomas Erlewine of AllMusic retrospectively gave it 3 stars out of 5, stating: "Well, if you just had your biggest hit ever, you'd probably try to replicate it, too. And if you were praised for being visionary because you played all your blues grooves to a slightly sequenced beat, you'd probably be tempted to not just continue in that direction, but to tighten the sequencer and graft on synthesizers, since it'll all signal how futuristic you are. [...] Problem is, no matter how much you dress ZZ Top up, they're still ZZ Top. Sometimes they can trick you into thinking they're a little flashier than usual, but they're still a lil' ol' blues band from Texas, kicking out blues-rockers. And blues-rock just doesn't kick when it's synthesized. [...] All this means that Afterburner is merely a product of its time -- the only record ZZ Top could have made at the time, but it hardly exists out of that time." Rolling Stone said "Afterburner may simply represent a transitional phase in this gifted eccentric's development as well as a tricky period in ZZ Top's continuing evolution from bell-bottom-blues band to sharp-dressed pop machine."

Robert Christgau gave a B score, stating: "With sales on Eliminator over five mil almost by accident, this hard-boogieing market strategy is defined by conscious commercial ambition--by its all but announced intention of making ZZ the next Bruce/Madonna/Prince/Michael, with two beards and a Beard at every checkout counter." Christgau cited "Rough Boy" and "Velcro Fly" as the highlights of the album.

The album was the band's first to hit number 1, topping the charts in New Zealand. It peaked at number 4 on the Billboard 200, at number 2 on the UK Albums Chart, and at number 6 on the Australian albums chart.

Track listing
All songs by Billy Gibbons, Dusty Hill and Frank Beard.

Personnel
Billy Gibbons – guitar, lead and backing vocals
Dusty Hill – bass, backing vocals, lead vocals on "Can't Stop Rockin'" and "Delirious", keyboards
Frank Beard – drums

Production
Producer – Bill Ham
Engineers – Joe Hardy, Bob Ludwig
Art director – Jeri McManus
Design – Jeri McManus
Art work – Barry E. Jackson

Charts

Weekly charts

Year-end charts

Certifications

References

ZZ Top albums
1985 albums
Albums produced by Bill Ham
Warner Records albums